This is a list of sports people who have played both cricket and rugby league at a high level.

Until recently, Scotland, Ireland and Wales all played as part of the English dominated Great Britain team.

Due to the historical relationship between rugby league and rugby union, many of these players have also competed in high level rugby union as well.

Australia

England

New Zealand

Wales
The Wales national cricket team plays only rarely, and the nation of Wales is usually subsumed under England for cricketing purposes.

Footnotes

See also
List of cricket and rugby union players
List of players who have converted from one football code to another

Rugby league players
Cricketers